In 1894, Khan Bahadur Raja Saheb Chaudhry Aurangzeb Khan of Chakwal was given the title of Khan Bahadur for his services in establishing the town of Faisalabad (original town name in British India, Lyallpur).

Impact of 19th century canal irrigation
At the end of the 19th century, Chaudhry Aurangzeb Khan, assistant colonisation officer for Chenab Colony, proposed the first system of tying land grants in the region to preserving camel population, which was falling at the time due to camel pasturage being converted to crop land via canal irrigation. The British rulers then signed agreements with the indigenous tribes and local people that traditionally used to raise and maintain herds of camels. According to these agreements, these local people were bound to continue providing camels as needed for military duty for the British Raj. 

Camels, at that time, were considered an important means of military transport in the region. Munshi Aurangzeb Khan was also cited by the Lieutenant-Governor of the Punjab for his assistance in work on irrigation projects. The title of Khan Baradur was conferred on him in 1894.

References

People from Faisalabad
19th-century Indian people
Punjabi people